San Sebastián Airport  is the airport serving San Sebastián in Basque Country, Spain. Despite its name, the facilities are located in the municipality of Hondarribia, with the runway stretching like a spit of land along the river Bidasoa right on the Spanish–French border.

Overview
The airport primarily serves domestic flights, especially to Madrid, and an international service to London City has commenced as of July 2022. A scheme is in the pipeline to lengthen the runway (2008) in order to meet the requirements established to provide service for larger aircraft. Preliminary plans are still coming up against strong opposition, which has added to the economic difficulties facing the carriers using the airport, making its future all the more uncertain. Other nearby airports are Bilbao Airport (117 km by car) and Biarritz Pays Basque Airport (32 km).

Airlines and destinations
The following airlines operate regular scheduled and charter flights at San Sebastián Airport:

Statistics

References

External links
San Sebastián Official Airport Website 

Airports in the Basque Country (autonomous community)
Airports established in 1955
1955 establishments in Spain